Talove is an urban-type settlement in Luhansk Raion (district) in Luhansk Oblast of eastern Ukraine. Population:

Demographics
Native language distribution as of the Ukrainian Census of 2001:
 Ukrainian: 4.55%
 Russian: 94.85%
 Others: 0.6%

References

Urban-type settlements in Luhansk Raion